Kahtuiyeh (also Romanized as Kahtūīyeh and Kahtūyeh; also known as Gāh Tūyeh and Kahtu) is a village in Jenah Rural District, Jenah District, Bastak County, Hormozgan Province, Iran. At the 2006 census, its population was 1,158, in 265 families.

References 

روستاي كهتوية واقع جنوب ايران منطقة هرمزكان ، روستاي كهتوية تقريبا برخوردار است از جمعيت مابين 2500 شخص تا 3000 شخص در اواخر 2012 ميلادي
مردمان روستا به لغة محلي حرف  ميزنند و لغة رسمي "فارسي" است
كهتوية معروف است به كبابي مشهورش از جملة كبابي مزكاني ، رمضان و صديق ... و
مردمان كهتو بيشترشون ساكن بودن روي كوه ولي  الان روبه بايين نشيني هستن

Populated places in Bastak County